The 2010 European Canoe Slalom Championships took place in Bratislava, Slovakia between August 13 and 15, 2010 under the auspices of the European Canoe Association (ECA). It was the 11th edition. The Championships were originally scheduled to take place in early June, but the high water level of the Danube River, which feeds the Čunovo Water Sports Centre, forced the organizers to cancel the event after some heat runs. It was later rescheduled for mid-August.

Medal summary

Men's results

Canoe

Kayak

Women's results

Canoe

Kayak

Medal table

References

 Official results
 European Canoe Association

European Canoe Slalom Championships
European Canoe Slalom Championships
European Canoe Slalom Championships
Sports competitions in Bratislava
Canoeing and kayaking competitions in Slovakia
2010s in Bratislava
European Canoe Slalom Championships